The 2001 Estoril Open was a tennis tournament played on outdoor clay courts at the Estoril Court Central in Oeiras in Portugal and was part of the International Series of the 2001 ATP Tour and of Tier IV of the 2001 WTA Tour. The tournament ran from 9 April until 15 April 2001. Juan Carlos Ferrero and Ángeles Montolio won the singles titles.

Finals

Men's singles

 Juan Carlos Ferrero defeated  Félix Mantilla 7–6(7–3), 4–6, 6–3
 It was Ferrero's 2nd title of the year and the 3rd of his career.

Women's singles

 Ángeles Montolio defeated  Elena Bovina 3–6, 6–3, 6–2
 It was Montolio's 1st title of the year and the 1st of her career.

Men's doubles

 Radek Štěpánek /  Michal Tabara defeated  Donald Johnson /  Nenad Zimonjić 6–4, 6–1
 It was Štěpánek's 1st title of the year and the 2nd of his career. It was Tabara's 2nd title of the year and the 2nd of his career.

Women's doubles

 Květa Hrdličková /  Barbara Rittner defeated  Tina Križan /  Katarina Srebotnik 3–6, 7–5, 6–1
 It was Hrdličková's only title of the year and the 3rd of her career. It was Rittner's 1st title of the year and the 3rd of her career.

External links
 Official website
 ATP Tournament Profile
 WTA Tournament Profile

Estoril Open
Estoril Open
Portugal Open
Estoril Open
 Estoril Open